Metallothionein 1X, also known as MT1X, is a protein which in humans is encoded by the gene.

See also 
 Metallothionein

References

Further reading